Charles Coleman Thach (March 15, 1860 – October 3, 1921) was the President of Alabama Polytechnic Institute, now known as Auburn University, from 1902 to 1920.

Biography
Charles Coleman Thach was born in Athens, Alabama in 1860. He graduated from the Agricultural and Mechanical College of Alabama, now known as Auburn University, in 1877. He became a Professor of English in 1885. He was also teaching Political Economy. He was President in the same institution from 1902 to 1920.

He was a member of the American Economic Association. He was a founding member of the Alabama Library Association.

Bibliography
The Creation of the Presidency, 1775-1789: A Study of Constitutional History

References

1860 births
1921 deaths
People from Athens, Alabama
Auburn University alumni
Auburn University faculty
Presidents of Auburn University